John Voss may refer to:

 John Voss (ice hockey) (born 1946), Canadian ice hockey goaltender 
 John Voss (sailor) (1858–1922), German-Canadian who sailed the around the world in a modified dug-out canoe he named Tilikum
 John Voss, a fictional character in Richard Russo's novel Empire Falls

See also
Johann Heinrich Voss (1751–1826), German classicist and poet